Tiit Made (born 13 March 1940 in Tallinn) is an Estonian  economist, writer, journalist, publicist, and politician. He was a member of the VII and VIII Riigikogu.

At the end of Soviet Estonia, he was one of the leading figure developing Self-Managing Estonia or IME project.

References

1940 births
Living people
Resigned Communist Party of the Soviet Union members
Estonian Centre Party politicians
Members of the Riigikogu, 1992–1995
Members of the Riigikogu, 1995–1999
Voters of the Estonian restoration of Independence
Estonian journalists
20th-century Estonian economists
Tallinn University of Technology alumni
Academic staff of the Tallinn University of Technology
People from Tallinn
Politicians from Tallinn
21st-century Estonian economists